This is a list of seasons completed by the Boise State Broncos men's college basketball team. Boise State joined the NCAA in 1968 when they began to compete as a four-year school. They have only ever had one season where they did not reach double digits in wins.

Seasons

  The first University Division (Division I) head coach was Murray Satterfield, who abruptly resigned during his eighth season on  Satterfield went 6–8 and 0–2 in conference; his replacement, Bus Connor, went 5–7.

References

 
Boise State Broncos
Boise State Broncos basketball seasons